Greenbrier State Forest is a  state forest between Lewisburg and White Sulphur Springs in Greenbrier County, West Virginia, United States. Greenbrier State Forest is located on Harts Run, a tributary of Howard Creek, and contains historic Kate's Mountain (3,330 feet/1,015 m).

Greenbrier State Forest features  of hiking trails, many of which are also suitable for mountain biking.  There is a heated pool, numerous picnic sites with two shelters, archery range, muzzleloading rifle range, horseshoes, 18 basket disc golf course, and volleyball.  A naturalist provides nature and recreational events during the summer months.

Hunting and fishing are permitted; state licenses are required.

Accommodations include 12 one- and two-bedroom cabins, 1 handicapped accessible cabin, and 16 campsites with electric hookups and water available at the central bathhouse.

References

External links 
 

Protected areas of Greenbrier County, West Virginia
West Virginia state forests
Campgrounds in West Virginia